Tiequon Aundray "Lil Fee" Cox (born December 1, 1965) is a convicted murderer who is incarcerated in San Quentin State Prison.

Cox was one of the prime suspects of a mass murder investigation into the deaths of Ebora Alexander, aged 59, Dietra Alexander, aged 25, and two boys Damon Bonner, aged 6, and Damani Garner-Alexander, aged 12. They were relatives of the former NFL defensive back Kermit Alexander. Cox was also a noted member of the Rollin' 60 Crips, and on parole on an unrelated charge.

Murders and possible motives
The events of August 31, 1984, are not clear, but what is known is that two suspects, described as being male, were seen bursting into the house of Ebora Alexander (the mother of Kermit Alexander) and opening fire, killing four people in the process. Two other family members who had previously been hiding managed to scare off the shooters, who were seen fleeing in a brown or maroon van. Later, the two suspects were caught and identified as Tiequon Cox, aged 18, and a man Horace Edwin Burns, aged 20. Both were known affiliates of the Rollin' 60. However, Burns was not one of the gunmen, but a lookout, along with two women, Lisa Brown and Ida Moore, who drove the getaway vehicle. Darren Charles Williams was later caught and identified as the other gunman.

In 1986, he was found guilty of four counts of first-degree murder under premeditation laws in the state of California. The jury further determined that he should be sentenced to death, placing him on death row.

Related information
Tiequon Cox stabbed Stanley Tookie Williams in 1988 while on death row. This is depicted in the 2004 TV film Redemption: The Stan Tookie Williams Story.

On July 18, 2000, three inmates, regarded as some of San Quentin's most dangerous prisoners, almost escaped. The three, identified as Tiequon Cox, Paul Tuilaepa and Noel Jackson, rushed towards a hole that had been unraveled from a four-foot section of a chain-link fence, nearly escaping with the intent of taking hostages. However, they failed, and with some difficulty, the officers managed to subdue all three inmates and take them into a controlled yard. The escape attempt left many officers re-addressing the serious security problems plaguing San Quentin for years.

References in literature and media
Several references have been made to Cox and the 1984 murders, including in Leon Bing's Do or Die, a book documenting the lives of at-risk youth in late 1980s inner-city Los Angeles, and the book Monster; A Biography of an L.A. Gang Member by Kody "Monster" Scott, a member of the Eight Trey Gangsta Crips in Los Angeles.

The details of the murder were discussed by Alex A. Alonso in a 2008 episode of History Channel's Gangland.

Outside the Lines featured Kermit Alexander and the murders of his family members on March 1, 2015.

References

1965 births
20th-century American criminals
American mass murderers
American male criminals
Mass murder in 1984
1984 murders in the United States
African-American people
American murderers of children
American prisoners sentenced to death
American people convicted of murder
Crips
History of Los Angeles
Living people
Place of birth missing (living people)
Criminals from Los Angeles
Prisoners sentenced to death by California
People convicted of murder by California
20th-century African-American people